Margaret May-som Shaw Wu (born June 28, 1950) is a Taiwanese–American industrial chemist and inventor. As a research chemist at ExxonMobil, Wu developed new lubricants for car engines. She was elected Fellow of the National Inventors Hall of Fame in 2020.

Early life and education 
Wu was born in Taipei, Taiwan. Her father was a meteorologist. She earned her bachelors degree in chemical engineering at the National Taipei University of Technology. She moved to the United States for her doctoral research, and joined the Department of Chemistry at the University of Rochester. She has said that New York City represents the best parts of America. Her friends helped her to overcome language barriers. After earning her doctorate, Wu joined American Cyanamid where she spent a year as a research chemist.

Research and career 
In 1977 Wu joined Mobil, where she worked on polymer synthesis, catalysis and zeolite chemistry. She developed new strategies to produce ethylene from methanol at high yields. A few years later, she switched her focus to synthetic oils. These fluids were used in automotive engine oil, reducing wear and helping fuel economy. She started working on polyalpha-olefin (PAOs), which were used in synthetic lubricants. The PAOs had no undesirable side chains, and had more desirable properties as a lubricant. Her efforts were recognized by the American Chemical Society, who named her their 2007 Industrial Chemist of the Year. She was the first woman to be made a Senior Scientific Advisor at ExxonMobil.

Wu retired in 2009 and remained as a consultant until 2016. She was inducted into the National Academy of Engineering in 2019, and the National Inventors Hall of Fame in 2020.

References 

Living people
20th-century American inventors
20th-century American chemists
20th-century American women scientists
21st-century American chemists
21st-century American women scientists
American women chemists
Women inventors
Scientists from Taipei
Taiwanese emigrants to the United States
National Taipei University of Technology alumni
University of Rochester alumni
ExxonMobil people
Members of the United States National Academy of Engineering
1950 births